Elstow/Combine World Field Aerodrome  is located  west of Elstow, Saskatchewan, Canada.

See also 
List of airports in Saskatchewan

References 

Registered aerodromes in Saskatchewan